Marie Zimmermann Farm is a historic home located in the Delaware Water Gap National Recreation Area at Delaware Township, Pike County, Pennsylvania.  It was built about 1910, and is a large -story, fieldstone dwelling with a gambrel roof with large dormers.  It has a two-story, stone rear wing with a steep gable roof.  At the intersection of the main house and wing is a round two-story tower, giving the house a French Provincial style.  The house is set in a farm complex with two large frame barns, a smaller frame house, and associated outbuildings.  It was the home of noted artist Marie Zimmermann (1879–1972).

It was added to the National Register of Historic Places in 1979.

References

External links
Friends of Marie Zimmermann website
"Designed with Nature: The Zimmermann Estate," Spanning the Gap, The newsletter of Delaware Water Gap National Recreation Area, Vol. 13 No. 2 Summer 1991
"Park Profile: Marie Zimmermann at her Farm," Spanning the Gap, The newsletter of Delaware Water Gap National Recreation Area, Vol. 24 No. 1 Spring 2002
"Photo Gallery: Marie Zimmermann Farm," Spanning the Gap, The newsletter of Delaware Water Gap National Recreation Area, Vol. 24 No. 1 Spring 2002

Houses on the National Register of Historic Places in Pennsylvania
Houses completed in 1910
Houses in Pike County, Pennsylvania
National Register of Historic Places in Pike County, Pennsylvania
Delaware Water Gap National Recreation Area